Rodney Fox (born 26 June 1946) is an Australian sprint canoeist who competed in the 1970s. He was eliminated in the semifinals of the K-4 1000 m event at the 1972 Summer Olympics in Munich.

References
Sports-reference.com profile

1946 births
Australian male canoeists
Canoeists at the 1972 Summer Olympics
Living people
Olympic canoeists of Australia
20th-century Australian people